KF Shkëndija Tiranë is an Albanian football club based in Tirana, and is the football team of the Sports mastery school Loro Boriçi. The academy is famous for being one of the most successful in the country and has produced 35 Albanian international footballers. The club's glory days were in the 1970s where they were regulars in the Kategoria Superiore and were featured in the Balkan Cup in 1971–72. In 1986, the club was renamed Studenti ILFK Tirana, but was reverted to Shkëndija Tiranë. The club currently competes in the Kategoria e Tretë.

History
In December 2010, Sulejman Mema took over the club, as principal of the Loro Boriçi School.

The club uses the Albania national team sport centre in Kamëz, Tiranë for training and matches.

Honours

Under-17s
Tirana U17 Championship: 2012–13

Under-19s
National U19 Championship (15):
1969–70, 1971–72, 1972–73, 1974–75, 1975–76, 1977–78, 1982–83, 1984–85, 1985–86, 1987–88, 1989–90, 2002–2003, 2012–13, 2018-2019

References

Football clubs in Albania
Association football clubs established in 1968
Football clubs in Tirana